Ithaca Downtown Historic District may refer to:

 Ithaca Downtown Historic District (Ithaca, Michigan), listed on the NRHP in Michigan
 Ithaca Downtown Historic District (Ithaca, New York), listed on the NRHP in New York